Moon Jae-in (born 24 January 1953) is a South Korean former politician who served as the 12th president of South Korea between 2017 and 2022. Prior to his presidency, he served as Senior Secretary for Civil Affairs and Chief of Staff to President Roh Moo-hyun, Member of the National Assembly, and Leader of the Democratic Party of Korea.

Born to North Korean refugees of House of Moon in Hamhung, Moon was raised in poverty in the southern port city of Busan. He excelled in school and studied law at Kyung Hee University. He became a lawyer and later involved in human rights activism with Roh Moo-hyun. He was imprisoned for organizing a protest against the Yushin Constitution. As a result of his work in human rights law, Moon was chosen to be the campaign manager for his longtime mentor Roh Moo-hyun in his successful bid for the 2002 presidential election. He served in Roh's administration in various official capacities. In 2012, Moon was a candidate for the Democratic United Party in the 2012 presidential election, in which he lost narrowly to Park Geun-hye in which Park was aided by the National Intelligence Service (NIS).

During the 2017 presidential election, Moon was elected president as the Democratic Party of Korea candidate following the impeachment of Park Geun-hye and her subsequent removal. As president, Moon has achieved international attention for his meetings with North Korean Chairman Kim Jong-un at inter-Korean summits in April, May, and September 2018, making him the third South Korean president to meet their North Korean counterpart. On June 30, 2019, he met with both Kim and Donald Trump, then-president of the United States, at the Korean Demilitarized Zone (DMZ).

Moon favors the Sunshine Policy, a peaceful Korean reunification. On economic policy, he favors reform of chaebols (conglomerates), has raised the minimum wage by more than 16 percent, and lowered the maximum workweek from 68 to 52 hours. During the COVID-19 pandemic in South Korea, Moon has received praise domestically and internationally, and helped his party win a historic victory in the 2020 South Korean legislative election.

Early life, education, and military service
Moon Jae-in was born in Geoje, South Korea, on January 24, 1953, shortly before the end of the Korean War, as the second child and oldest son among five children of father Moon Yong-hyung and mother Kang Han-ok. His parents were refugees from South Hamgyong Province, North Korea who fled their native city of Hungnam in the Hungnam evacuation during the Korean War. His father worked as head of agriculture department who detains food, especially rice of Korean colonial people as one of the main tasks at the Heungnam, Hamju, South Hamgyong Province.

His family eventually settled in Busan. Since his father did not want to become a government employee as he had been in North Korea, his father started a business selling socks, which left his family in great debt. His mother became the main earner by selling clothes received from relief organizations and delivering briquettes. Moon's family became attached to the Catholic Church when his mother went to the local cathedral to receive whole milk powder. Moon once said in an interview that he did not know how to ride a bike since his family was too poor to afford a bike or a monthly school tuition.

Moon entered Kyungnam High School and reportedly placed at the top of his class. He was accepted to study law at Kyung Hee University with a full scholarship. At university, he met his future wife, Kim Jung-sook. After organizing a student protest against the Yushin Constitution, he was arrested, convicted, imprisoned, and expelled from the university. Later, he was conscripted into the military and assigned to the South Korean special forces, where he participated in "Operation Paul Bunyan" during the axe murder incident in Panmunjom.

After his honourable discharge, the death of his father influenced him to decide to take the bar exam. He stayed at the Buddhist temple of Daeheungsa to study for the exam, and passed the first of two rounds in 1979. In 1980, he returned to the university to complete his remaining year of his studies. Later that year, he passed the second round and was admitted to the Judicial Research and Training Institute. He graduated from the Institute as the second in his class but was not admitted as a judge or state prosecutor due to his history of student activism against the Yushin dictatorship under Park Chung-hee. Moon chose to go into private practice instead.

Early career

Human rights lawyer
After becoming a lawyer, he worked under future president Roh Moo-hyun in the 1980s. Along with Roh, he took cases involving the labor rights issues and became renowned for his work in labor human rights. They remained friends up until Roh's suicide in 2009.

He was a founding member of the progressive South Korean newspaper, The Hankyoreh, in 1988.

Roh Moo-hyun administration
Yielding to Roh's insistence, Moon became Roh's campaign manager during his presidential bid. After Roh's victory, Moon became Roh's close aide holding various roles in a presidential administration. Moon held roles as Senior Presidential Secretary for Civil Affairs, Senior Presidential Secretary for Civil Society and Chief Presidential Secretary from 2003 to 2008. When the National Assembly voted to impeach Roh in 2004, Moon led the legal delegation for Roh at the Constitutional Court and won the case. Moon, as Roh's chief of staff, led the preparation committee of the 2nd Inter-Korean Summit but did not attend the summit.

Political career before the presidency

Entry to politics
Despite his earlier indifference, he began to get involved in politics. He published a memoir called Moon Jae-in: The Destiny which became a bestseller. His popularity had been rising steady against the likely opponent in the presidential race, Park Geun-hye. In a February 2012 poll, Moon rivaled Park in popularity.

Moon managed to capitalize on the conservatives' decline in popularity amid a series of corruption scandals. As one pundit said, "Moon had managed to portray himself as a moderate and rational leader who has the backing of the younger generation".

2012 general election 

In 2012, Moon entered a bid for a seat in the National Assembly in the 19th legislative election. Moon won a seat in the Sasang District of Busan on April 11, 2012, as a member of the Democratic United Party with 55% of the vote. As of 2021, Sasang District belongs to the Conservative Party.

2012 presidential campaign 
On September 16, 2012, Moon received the presidential nomination for the Democratic United Party.

He ran for the 2012 presidential election as the Democratic United Party's candidate in a three-way race against Park Geun-hye, the incumbent ruling party's candidate and daughter of the late president Park Chung-hee, as well as independent software mogul Ahn Cheol-soo. Ahn dropped out of the race and endorsed Moon after polls showed a most likely definitive loss for both candidates were there to be a three-way race against Park. Moon went on to lose the election.

Leader of the Democratic Party 
Moon was elected as the leader of New Politics Alliance for Democracy (NPAD) on February 2, 2015. Prior to his election, Moon and NPAD party leader and 2012 presidential candidate rival Ahn Cheol-soo had many public disputes over the direction of the party.

Moon's official role led Ahn Cheol-soo to quit and form the centrist People's Party. Ahn's departure and Moon's new tenure as party leader led to renaming the liberal, NPAD Party as the new Democratic Party.

During his leadership, Moon scouted several politically prominent people, including police studies/criminology expert Pyo Chang-won, political critic Lee Chul-hee, and former president Park's secretary Cho Ung-chun to prepare for upcoming 2016 legislative elections. After his recruitment, Moon resigned his position for another scouted advisor/former Park advisor Kim Chong-in.

2017 presidential election

Primary and general election 

Moon was considered the frontrunner to win Korea's 2017 presidential election, which would be the 19th term of the country's presidency, following the impeachment and removal of Park Geun-hye. The election had originally been scheduled for December 2017, but was brought forward to May 2017 in order to ensure that they would take place within 60 days of Park's removal, as required by the Constitution.

He won the Democratic Party's nomination against fellow party members Ahn Hee-jung, Lee Jae-myung, and Choi Sung with 57% of the votes.

The general election originally had 15 announced candidates. Moon faced four other major party nominees during the election, including 2012 presidential rival and past party colleague Ahn Cheol-soo of the People's Party and Hong Jun-pyo of the Liberty Korea Party. He was elected the 19th president of South Korea in Korea's 19th presidential election by a large plurality over two.

On May 10, 2017, Moon won the election with a plurality of 41.1% votes (out of 13,423,800 votes nationwide). As Moon was elected in a special election, he did not have the usual 60-day transition period of previous administrations, but was instead inaugurated the day after the election.

Campaign positions on domestic policy

Economic policy 
Moon's campaign promise in 2017 included intentions to put a 10 trillion won ($8.9 billion) fiscal stimulus to support job creation, start-ups, and small to mid-sized companies. His announced goal is to create 810,000 public sector jobs through raising taxes on the wealthy.

Moon's policy against corporate corruption, specifically in regards to Korean conglomerates known as "chaebols " is to give "minority shareholders more power in electing board members" of the companies.

Transparency 
Moon also promised transparency in his presidency, moving the presidential residence from the palatial and isolated Blue House to an existing government complex in downtown Seoul.

Homophobia controversy 
Moon was criticized for homophobic comments he made in a televised presidential debate for the 2017 presidential election, where Moon said he opposed homosexuality, in response to conservative candidate Hong Jun-pyo's remarks that gay soldiers were a source of weakness in the South Korean military. Moon's remark prompted immediate criticism during the debate from Sim Sang-jung, the sole presidential candidate to support LGBT rights and a member of the left wing Justice Party. The conservative remark also prompted outrage from gay rights activists, considering Moon's representation as the leading liberal candidate and former human rights lawyer. Some of Moon's supporters dismissed the comments as a necessity to win, as South Koreans tend to be conservative in social issues. Moon later backtracked on his original comments, clarifying that he believes there should be no discrimination based on sexual orientation while opposing legalizing same-sex marriage.

Campaign positions on foreign policy 
Moon has favored a peaceful reunification between the two Koreas. He was both widely criticized and widely praised for his comments stating that his first visit if elected president would be to visit North Korea, a visit that would be not unlike Roh Moo-hyun's visit to the country in 2007. Similarly, Moon's foreign policy towards North Korea is considered to closely align with the Sunshine Policy embraced by former liberal presidents Kim Dae-jung and Roh Moo-hyun.

His 2017 presidential campaign has supported re-opening of the Kaesong industrial park.

Moon's relatively liberal stance in foreign policy is reflected as he is quoted in a book: "I'm pro-U.S., but now South Korea should adopt diplomacy in which it can discuss a U.S. request and say no to the Americans." He opposes a re-balance of the security alliance with the United States, but has also stated that he would like South Korea "to be able to take the lead on matters on the Korean Peninsula." At the same time, Moon has stated that he considers America as a "friend" for its role in helping South Korea avoid communism while helping its economic growth.

Presidency (2017–2022) 

Moon was sworn into office immediately after official votes were counted on 10 May, replacing Acting President and Prime Minister Hwang Kyo-ahn. There was no transition period between the election and inauguration, unlike other presidential elections due to the nature of an election following a presidential impeachment. He served out the typical single five-year term with his presidential term concluding in 2022.

President Moon and his government has been widely described as left-wing or liberal by media.

Domestic policy

Chaebol reform 
South Korea's economic growth has been attributed in large part to Chaebols, or family-owned conglomerates. Prominent examples of conglomerates include Samsung and Hyundai, concentrated power (collusion), connections with the government including most recently the 2016 Choi Soon-sil scandal which ultimately led to the special election Moon won. Moon subsequently appointed "chaebol sniper" Kim Sang-jo, a well-known shareholder activist, to the role of fair-trade commissioner aimed at reforming chaebols.

Tech policy 
As President, Moon signed into law an amendment to the Telecommunications Business Act that has been referred to as the "Anti-Google Law". The legislation prohibits Apple and Google, which operate the App Store and Google Play Store, respectively, from requiring app developers on these platforms to use their payment systems to sell their products. As a result, app developers will be able to avoid paying commission to Apple or Google by directing customers to pay through alternate platforms.

Health care policy 
Moon's health care policy included the benefit coverage expansion in National Health Insurance.

Prosecution reform 
Prosecution reform was implemented to rearrange the prosecution and its investigation right and to rebuild the corrupt prosecution.

So far, the prosecution have had both investigation right ,and accusation right and it leads to the absolute power.

So, the main purpose of coordinating the prosecution and police investigation rights is to weaken the accusation right of the prosecution.

It was started under the Moon Jae-in administration by former Ministers of Justice such as Cho Guk, Choo Mi-ae, and Park Beom-gye. Yoon Seok-yeol, who is currently serving as president, also participated as former Prosecutor General.

As part of the process, the Corruption Investigation Office for high-ranking officials was established, and the backlash from the prosecution was very strong.

Against this ‘power rearrange’ process, some executives of prosecution withdrew their seats as a sign of resistance.

In addition, through coordinating the prosecution and police investigation rights, the ruling party tried to shift the power of the prosecution to others.

Like the time the Corruption Investigation Office For High-ranking Officials was established, high-ranking officials of the prosecution again resigned as a sign of resistance against coordinating the prosecution and police investigation rights.

As a result, the power of the prosecution  weakened compared to the past, by the prosecution reform during the Moon Jae-in administration.

But, still there are some limitations. As the opposition party interrupted the related legislation process ,it took more time than usual and some of the core part of the prosecution reform was revised.

Capital punishment 
Moon opposed efforts to re-implement capital punishment.

Minimum wage 
Moon's government launched a series of minimum wage hikes. One of these was in 2018, which raised the minimum wage by 16.4% from the previous year to 7,530 won (US$6.65) an hour. In a 2018 report, the NGO Oxfam cited South Korea as one of the few countries in Asia to have made efforts to reduce inequality that year.

Maximum hour work week 
The maximum hour work week was reduced from 68 to 52. In October 2018, a study conducted by a telecommunications firm found that in central Seoul the amount of time people spent in or near their workplace fell by 55 minutes, and time spent of leisure activities went up in residential areas. However, they found little to no change elsewhere in the country. Bars and restaurants in central Seoul reported a loss in business.

Education 
Moon's predecessor and daughter of Park Chung-hee, Park Geun-hye, originally planned to mandate usage of state-issued history textbooks in 2018. Moon reversed those plans in May 2017 in one of his first major acts as president. Critics of Park's original plan saw this as a way for Park to mitigate some representations of her father's oppressive policies under a dictatorial rule, only highlighting the positive accomplishments of the past. Park previously stated in 2015 that she wanted to replace the "left-leaning" books with those created from the government that would instill greater patriotism. Although the Park government responded to subsequent backlash by switching from its official position of requiring the textbooks to be used, to allowing schools the choice to use them, Moon's action scrapped the program altogether. Schools continued using privately published, government-approved textbooks written under educational guidelines instead.

Animal rights and dog meat 
During his campaign, Moon promised to adopt a dog from an animal sanctuary; this was considered relevant to South Korean politics, as the country allows for consumption of dog meat. He adopted Tory, a four-year-old black mongrel saved from a dog meat farm, from an animal rights group. The move was considered as sending "a strong message against the dog meat trade".

Energy 

Moon's administration focused on increasing South Korea's consumption of natural gas, away from nuclear and coal as sources of energy. These plans include delaying construction on nuclear reactors as well as re-opening dialogue around a natural gas pipeline that would come from Russia and pass through North Korea. At the event on June 19, 2017, marking the end of operations at South Korea's oldest nuclear reactor, Kori Unit 1, Moon outlined his plan for the future of energy in Korea, saying "we will abandon the development policy centered on nuclear power plants and exit the era of nuclear energy." This would be implemented by canceling plans for new nuclear power plants and not renewing licenses for operating plants. In addition, he shut down eight coal-fired power plants upon assuming office in May 2017, and pledged to shut down the remaining ten coal plants by the end of his term. In the long term, he envisioned renewable sources would eventually be able to meet Korea's demand, but in the interim, proposed liquefied natural gas (LNG) as a stopgap measure while coal and nuclear were taken offline in the coming decades.

COVID-19 pandemic 

Moon's response to the COVID-19 pandemic has been praised both domestically and internationally. In the first few weeks of March 2020, daily cases fell from 800 to fewer than 100, reducing daily cases by more than 90% at its peak.

However, more than 1.5 million South Koreans signed a petition to impeach Moon over what they claimed was the government's initial mishandling of the coronavirus outbreak in South Korea. In response, more than 1.3 million South Koreans signed a second petition in just two weeks to support Moon over what they claimed was the government's capable control of the coronavirus.

An opinion poll conducted between March 5 and 6, 2020 by Embrain, a public polling company, showed that 53% of the public had a positive evaluation of Moon's handling of the coronavirus crisis. An opinion poll by Gallup Korea in the first week of March 2020 showed his approval rating rose from 44% to 67%, due to public's approval of his administration's handling of the outbreak. By January 2021, according to a Realmeter survey, his approval rating decreased to 34%, the lowest point during his presidency.

According to the Yonhap News Agency, James Kim, the Chairman of the American Chamber of Commerce in Korea stated that "Korea is proactively and transparently dealing with COVID-19. The confirmed cases are surging in Korea, due to the country’s well-prepared testing procedures compared to other countries." CNBC's Matt McCarthy, a New York City doctor, praised Moon's government work on solving the coronavirus crisis, stating that "South Korea had been able to test tens of thousands of people. With the country's aggressive testing efforts, Korea's death toll from the disease is less than 1%, while the global average is 3.4%. This is thanks to the government’s early preparation for the outbreak of infectious diseases."

LGBT rights 
Moon opposes same-sex marriage. In a 2017 presidential television  debate, he openly declared that he opposes homosexuality in some forms.

Speaking to Buddhist and Christian religious leaders in October 2019, Moon said, "A national consensus should be the priority for same-sex marriage. However, regarding the human rights of sexual minorities, they should not be socially persecuted or discriminated against."

In July 2020, the proposal of South Korea's first comprehensive anti-discrimination law, which would provide legal protection for minority communities, including the LGBTQ community, did not receive any open support from Moon. However, in December 2020, in a special report by the National Human Rights Commission of Korea, Moon emphasized the necessity of enacting the Equality Act in the country.

Human Rights Watch, in their Word Report 2020, called on the Korean government to take note of the urgent need for protecting the rights of Korea's lesbian, gay, bisexual and transgender community. "President Moon Jae-in, who started his legal career fighting for human rights, is in several ways failing to promote them now," said John Sifton, Asia advocacy director at Human Rights Watch. "In 2020, he and his government need to reverse course and prioritize human rights in South Korea, North Korea, and worldwide."

2020 legislative election and subsequent reforms

Moon's Democratic Party won 163 constituency seats, while their satellite Platform party won 17 proportional representation seats, giving the alliance a total of 180 seats in the 300-seat assembly, enough to reach the three-fifths super-majority required to fast-track assembly procedures and "do everything but revising the Constitution at the parliament." This was the largest majority for any party since democracy was restored in 1987. The United Future Party and their satellite Future Korea Party won 84 constituency and 19 proportional seats respectively; their total of 103 seats (34.3%) was the worst conservative result since the 1960 legislative elections.

Subsequently, with its new three-fifths majority, the Democratic Party implemented a series of reforms and were approved by the National Assembly in December 2020 including:
 removal of the National Intelligence Service (NIS)'s involvement in domestic intelligence and activities and transferring of such powers to the National Police Agency
 Revisions to the May 18 Special Act, penalizing those involved in making false factual claims regarding the 1980 Gwangju Uprising
 Revisions to the Inter-Korean Relations Act, penalizing sending of flyers to North Korea via balloons launched near the demilitarized zone
 Revisions to the Labor Standards Act, setting the maximum work week to 52 hours a week, including overtime while allowing a business to exceed the 52-hour limit by giving an extended paid vacation for workers.
 guaranteed paid parental leave for temporary workers
 expansions to the range of workers who can participate in unions and raising the maximum duration of a collective bargaining agreement from two years to three years.
 launch of the new Corruption Investigation Office for High-ranking Officials (CIO) and stripping the opposition's right to veto appointments of a new agency head.
 establishment of local policing, allowing each city and province to establish its own autonomous police force instead of a single national police force. 
 establishment of a new National Bureau of Investigation, quasi-independent and insulated from the National Police Agency.

Foreign policy

International relations 

Moon visited the United States to meet with U.S. President Donald Trump in June 2017, discussing U.S.-Korea trade relations as well as North Korea's missile programs. Moon revealed in a joint news conference that President Trump accepted an invitation to visit South Korea.

North Korea 

Outlining his North Korea strategy in a speech in Berlin, Germany, on July 6, 2017, Moon characterized the process leading to unification as a long-term project, rather than laying out any detailed plans for a unified Korea.

He emphasized alliance with the United States and specified the need to assure dismantlement of North Korea's nuclear weapons program. At the same time he presented the question of unification in a regional context and signaled his hopes of working in cooperation with the international community. He supported sanctions against North Korea, while leaving open the possibility of their being rescinded, and indicated that it is crucial to establish a peace treaty with North Korea to end the Korean War officially in exchange for denuclearization.

Moon opposed the full deployment of THAAD (Terminal High Altitude Area Defense) systems during his presidential campaign and called for more peace talks engaging with North Korea.

As of late July, following North Korea's latest missile launch and increasingly aggressive actions, Moon asked the U.S. permission to build up its domestic defense systems and temporarily set up a full THAAD system.

Moon met with Kim Jong-un, Chairman of the Workers' Party of Korea, on April 27, 2018.

The inter-Korean rapprochement arouses broad enthusiasm among the South Korean population: Moon Jae-in's popularity reached 68% in April 2018.

Kim and Moon met again on May 26. The second meeting was also at the DMZ, this time on the North Korean side of the Panmunjom village. The meeting took two hours. The meeting had not been publicly announced beforehand. The meeting was largely centered around the cancelled summit with Donald Trump.

In September 2018, Moon Jae-in visited Pyongyang in the September 2018 inter-Korean summit. He and 150 delegates—including prominent figures in business, culture, and religion—flew to the Sunan Airport in Pyongyang and met with Kim Jong-un. The two Korean leaders announced an agreement to decrease hostilities on the DMZ, further joint-economic projects, and open North Korean weapons facilities to international experts. The leaders also gave a speech to 150,000 North Korean citizens in the Rungrado 1st of May Stadium with themes of unification, lasting peace, and friendship. Moon also climbed Mount Paektu with Kim, which had been a "long unfulfilled dream" for him.
And Moon was called "Kim Jong Un's Top Spokesman" by Bloomberg News.
In October 2018, Moon visited Europe and lobbied for reconciliation with North Korea during the tour.

In March 2019, U.N. panel accused South Korea of violating sanctions by not notifying the Security Council about its deliveries of petroleum products for use at inter-Korean joint liaison office.
Also in the Annex of the Updated Guidance on Addressing North Korea’s Illicit Shipping Practices, issued from United States Department of the Treasury, a ship of South Korea was listed as that believed to have engaged in ship-to-ship transfers with North Korean tankers.

In January 2020, Moon was still serious about inter-Korean cooperation.
However, on June 16, North Korea blew up an inter-Korean joint liaison office.
On September 23, as video speech at 75th Session of United Nations General Assembly, Moon mentioned about his hope that "the UN and the international community provide support so that we can advance into an era of reconciliation and prosperity through the end-of-war declaration" and "the end-of-war declaration will open the door to complete demilitarization and permanent peace regime on the Korean Peninsula."

Unemployment 

In January 2019, South Korea's unemployment rate hit 4.5%, the highest number observed for the month of January since 2010, while the youth unemployment rate, which tracks Koreans aged 25–34 who have not secured jobs, reached its highest in South Korea in 19 years. According to Statistics Korea, 338,000 young Koreans were unemployed in July 2018. The number is the highest since youth unemployment marked 434,000 in 1999, as the nation was still recovering from the 1997 Asian Financial Crisis. Some experts said the current Moon Jae-in government's purportedly pro-labor policies, including the raise in minimum wage, which led The Wall Street Journal to call President Moon Jae-In's economic program "Asia’s most radical left-wing", and reduction of maximum weekly work hours from 68 to 52, may be contributors to the increasing number of Koreans unable to find jobs.

In November 2018, the Financial Times reported that President Moon Jae-In replaced Kim Dong-yeon, finance minister, by Hong Nam-ki, an economic policy official currently serving in the prime minister's office, and Jang Ha-sung, presidential chief of staff for policy. The reshuffle sets the stage for new economic ideas "in a nation that is struggling to transition away from its once-successful manufacturing model".

As of December 2021, the unemployment rate was down to 3.7%, the lowest since 2017 and in line with the unemployment rate of the previous two decades.

Post-presidency (2022-present)

Moon left office on 9 May 2022 and was succeeded the next day by Yoon Suk-yeol, who previously was appointed by Moon to be Prosecutor General of South Korea. Moon also was the final president to occupy the Blue House as the official presidential office and residence after 74 years, as Yoon moved the presidential office to the former Ministry of Defence building at Yongsan District, Seoul upon taking office. Moon now resides at Pyeongsan Village, at Yangsan, South Gyeongsang Province.

Legacy
Moon left office as the most popular president in the history of the 6th Republic since free and fair elections resumed in 1987. However, critics claimed that these ratings were due to a massive PR campaign aimed at creating and maintaining a good public image, as well as a failure to tackle controversial issues during his presidency. 

OECD and Pew Research Center polls showed that during and after the COVID-19 pandemic, which took place during Moon's presidency, South Koreans’ levels of trust in government increased, and the government oversaw a more responsive and effective disaster response to the pandemic compared to previous disasters which took place in South Korea, such as the MERS outbreak and the Sewol ferry disaster. Moon's government reduced the maximum hour work week from 68 hours to 52, which led to an increase in work-life balance, increased the minimum wage, expanded childcare benefits and provision, and also health care coverage. Moon's government also began a transition to green economic growth, introducing a Green New Deal plan and pledged carbon neutrality by 2040. 

However, Moon's government did not act on a new anti-discrimination bill despite having a majority in the National Assembly. It also failed to effectively resolve a housing crisis in the Seoul area and its surroundings (where half of South Korea's population resides). The Seoul housing crisis was said to be enough to swing the 2022 presidential election to the opposition conservatives to succeed Moon.

For foreign policy, Moon would be remembered for presiding over South Korea's increased stature and prestige in international affairs as a middle power, and pushing forward with trade negotiations with South East Asia and India under his signature New Southern Policy (NSP). NSP aimed to diversify South Korea's economic and strategic relationships due to uncertainty caused by increasing competition between its closest ally, the United States, and the largest trading partner, China. However, Moon's summits with North Korea failed to achieve any significant breakthrough in inter-Korean or US-North Korea relations, and relations between South Korea and Japan fell to further new lows.

Electoral history

Honours

National honours
: Recipient of the Grand Order of Mugunghwa (May 3, 2022)

Foreign distinctions
: Grand Star of the Decoration of Honour for Services to the Republic of Austria (June 14, 2021)
: Grand Collar of the Order of Boyaca (August 25, 2021)
: Grand Cross of the  Order of Saint Olav (June 12, 2019)
: Member of the Order for Exceptional Merits (September 21, 2021)
: Collar of the Order of Civil Merit (June 8, 2021)
: Knight of the Royal Order of the Seraphim (June 14, 2019)

Other awards 
Atlantic Council: Global Citizen Awards (September 19, 2017)
:  Gold Olympic Order (August 30, 2018)
Time: One of the 100 Most Influential People of 2018

Controversies and issues

Libel case 
In September 2015, Moon sued former prosecutor Koh Young-ju for libel in response to a statement he had made during Moon's campaign in 2013. Koh had been quoted as calling Moon a "communist." As a public figure, Koh had been noted for his investigation into the Burim incident, where he investigated five alleged communists who were later convicted of violating the anti-Communist National Security Law. On August 23, 2018, Seoul Central District Court Judge Kim Kyung-jin. Koh lauded the ruling as a victory for freedom of speech in South Korea. But on June 2, 2020, the case was appealed. The prosecutor representing Moon is seeking one and a half years of jail time for Koh.

2018 opinion rigging scandal in South Korea
In April 2018, a group of supporters of the South Korean President Moon Jae-in were charged with online opinion rigging. The accused suspects were the members of the ruling Democratic Party (DPK). The main perpetrator, as well as the leader of the pro-Moon group, was a well-known power-blogger called "Druking".

In 2018, the special prosecutor indicted Gyeongnam Province Governor Kim Kyung-soo in relation to this case. In 2019, he was jailed for two years on charges of online-rigging operations in both the first and second instance. On 21 July 2021, he was sentenced to two years by the Supreme Court for online-rigging operations (crime on 'Interference with Business' by damaging or destroying any data processor) and eventually lost his position as governor.

Rallies held by anti-Moon 
In 2019, on the Liberation Day August 15, large-scale flag rallies occurred in central Seoul, including Seoul Station, City Hall Plaza, Daehanmun, and the outer ring of Gwanghwamun Plaza, calling to impeach Moon Jae-in.
The protest demonstration was also held on October 3, the national foundation day.

In 2020, although a spike in new coronavirus cases in South Korea has prompted authorities to reimpose tighter social distancing curbs in Seoul, there were thousands of demonstrators protesting against Moon Jae-in's policies.
Police said that they will probe all participants of demonstrations held in downtown Seoul on the day to look into whether they violated a court decision related to COVID-19 and other regulations.
On October 3 the national foundation day, conservative groups held drive-thru anti-government rallies in southern Seoul, amid concerns about the spread of the new coronavirus.

Alleged harassment of human rights groups 
On July 13, 2020, Park Sang-hak, a citizen of South Korea and North Korean defector, wrote an op-ed in The Washington Post. He contended that the Moon administration was working to silence human rights activists in an effort to placate North Korea. Park wrote, "Ten days ago, a TV station revealed my home address to the world, exposing me to other North Korean assassins and their supporters in the South. My personal bank accounts are under investigation, and the government has forbidden me from leaving the country. On June 30, the government moved to pull the civic licenses of our nongovernmental organization, preventing us from holding charity fundraisers." Park cited other examples of the Moon administration's interference with human rights activists, including a 2018 effort by NIS agents under the Moon administration to block journalists from accessing a speech by Thae Yong-ho, the highest-ranking official known to have defected from North Korea.

In response to the Moon administration's treatment of Park Sang-hak, the North Korea Freedom Coalition issued a letter to President Moon. It alleged that human rights activists had been "harassed" and urged the Moon administration to "cease these actions of intimidation which seek to silence their freedom of expression." The letter noted that the South Korean government's actions appeared to conflict with the International Covenant on Civil and Political Rights treaty, which was signed by South Korea in 1990. Signatories included Suzanne Scholte.

Personal life

Family 
Moon married Kim Jung-sook, a vocalist at Kyung Hee University where he was also a student.

He and Kim both individually revealed in separate Korean talk shows that they met each other when Moon was a student activist protesting the Yushin Constitution.

He has a daughter and a son.

Pets 
Moon and Kim  lived with   four dogs and a cat at the Blue House.

Before elected as the president in 2017, they lived with several dogs and cats who were all once abandoned by their previous guardians. Among those, a dog Maru (a Pungsan dog) and a cat Jjing-jjing (or Jjing-Jjing-ee ) have been confirmed to live with them at the Blue House either by the media or its official social media posts. Jjing-jjing is the country's first-ever "First Cat."

After settling in at the official presidential residence at the Blue House, a dog Tory (a mixed-breed) was adopted from an animal shelter in contrast with other "First Dogs" who have traditionally been purebred Jindo dogs. In regards to Tory's adoption, Moon stated that "we need to pay more attention to abandoned animals and care for them as a society" and that he wanted to remove the stigma against Tory's dark coat, which contributed to him being virtually un-adoptable for two years after he was rescued in 2015.
He also received a pair of Pungsan dogs male Song-gang and female Gom-ee from North Korean counterpart Kim Jong-un as a gift shortly after meeting in September 2018. Gom-ee later gave birth to six puppies San-ee, Deul-ee, Gang-ee, Byul-ee, Dal-ee and Hen-nim named after Korean words for parts of nature - a mountain, grass field, a river, a star, the Moon and the Sun. On August 30, 2019, six puppies have been sent to Seoul, Incheon, Daejeon and Gwangju leaving their parents at the Blue House.

Religion 
Moon is the third Korean president who is a Catholic, after Kim Dae-jung and Roh Moo-hyun  (a lapsed Catholic). Moon's wife, First Lady Kim Jung-sook, is also Catholic. He is the second leader who remains a practicing Catholic while in office; his baptismal (or Christian) name is Timothy.

Nickname 
His nickname is the "Dark King", after the character Silvers Rayleigh from the Japanese manga series One Piece.

Authored books

See also 
 Outline of South Korea

Notes

References

External links

 Moon Jae-in on Twitter
Moon Jae-in Camp 

|-

|-

|-

|-

|-

|-

 

 
1953 births
Kyung Hee University alumni
Kyungnam High School alumni
Living people
Members of the National Assembly (South Korea)
Minjoo Party of Korea politicians
People from Geoje
Presidents of South Korea
Roh Moo-hyun
20th-century South Korean lawyers
South Korean Roman Catholics
Recipients of the Olympic Order
Collars of the Order of Civil Merit
Republic of Korea Army personnel
21st-century South Korean politicians
Chiefs of Staff to the President of South Korea